Bénoué National Park is a national park of Cameroon and a UNESCO designated Biosphere Reserve. The public road to Tcholliré cuts across the northern part of the park. The western boundary is made up of the main road linking the towns of Garoua to the north, with Ngaoundéré to the south. The park can be accessed coming north from Ngaoundéré.

History
In 1932, the area was established as a Faunal Reserve.  It was upgraded to a National Park in 1968, and in 1981, it became a Biosphere Reserve.

Geography

The National Park is located in the northeastern part of Cameroon in the Bénoué Department. It lies in the Bénoué savanna belt, a humid savannah woodland area  between the cities of Garoua in the north and Ngaoundéré to the south. The higher elevations are characterized by large rocky massifs, while the undulating plain and forest  characterizes the lower sections. Eight hunting reserves, totaling , surround the park except along the main road.

Flora and fauna

The habitat in Bénoué National Park is characterized by wooded grassland. It includes several types of Sudanian woodland such as Isoberlinia-dominated and other woodland in the south-centre, to shorter, more open, mixed wooded grassland in the north, dry Anogeissus  forest, semi-evergreen riparian forest and thickets along the Bénoué and its major affluents.

African elephant, spotted hyena, waterbuck, warthog and monkeys are also found in the park. The predominant large ungulates in the park are antelope such as the kob, western hartebeest, giant eland and waterbuck, as well as African buffalo. The only place in Africa where there is a realistic chance to view the giant eland, Africa's largest antelope, is within Bénoué National Park. The African wild dog is present within the national park, though less common here than in Faro National Park. Bénoué National Park is known for its hippopotamus colonies. Along with hippo, crocodile are common in the rivers.

Since 2005, the protected area is considered a Lion Conservation Unit. In 2011, the lion population was estimated at 200 adult individuals.

Bénoué National Park is an Important Bird Area (#CM007) with recent surveys identifying 306 species. In the dry season, sandbars exposed by fluctuating levels of the sandy Bénoué River provide habitat for plover and other waterbirds. Common species include Adamawa turtle-dove, crocodile bird, red-throated bee-eater, red-winged grey warbler, stone partridge, and violet turaco.

Population

The majority of the population within the park is nomadic. There is a loose social structure that park guards and conservationists deal with, taking on roles such as community educators and arbitrators. At least one incident of kleptoparasitism, stealing meat from a lion kill, was documented at Bénoué National Park.

See also
 Wildlife of Cameroon

References

Further reading

External links 

Biosphere reserves of Cameroon
National parks of Cameroon
Protected areas established in 1968
1968 establishments in Cameroon
Northern Congolian forest–savanna mosaic